La Jornada is a Nicaraguan newspaper, with offices in the capital Managua. La Jornada was founded in 1986 as a news program on radio and later, in 1996, it evolved to a printed monthly magazine. In 2005, it took its present form as a daily digital newspaper.

References

External links
La Jornada website (Spanish)

Daily newspapers published in Nicaragua
Spanish-language newspapers
Newspapers established in 2005
Mass media in Managua